Onyx Records, Inc., was a small, independent American record label based in Manhattan, New York, co-founded on July 15, 1971, by Joe Fields (1929–2017) and Don Schlitten (born 1932) and managed by Gentry McCreary (born 1941). Its address was at 160 West 71st Street on the Upper West Side.

History 
Onyx flourished from its founding through 1978, re-issuing recordings, including those of Art Tatum, Hot Lips Page, Don Byas, and Charlie Parker.  Its initial releases were selections from the Jerry Newman Collection (né Jerome Robert Newman; 1918–1970), who, in 1941, recorded live performances at clubs in Harlem while a student at Columbia University. The name "Onyx" was the namesake of four jazz clubs – all named the Onyx Club – all, at different times, on West 52nd Street in Manhattan, but notably, the club that ran from 1942 to 1949 at the vanguard of bebop.  Onyx Records received acclaim from Dan Morgenstern for its release of  radio broadcast transcriptions from KFBI Wichita featuring the Jay McShann Band with Charlie Parker.

Corporate background 
Onyx Records was founded as a New York corporation on July 15, 1971, under the name of Avatar Productions, Inc. The name was changed to Onyx Records, Inc., in 1973. Onyx was owned equally by Joe Fields and Don Schlitten. Onyx was in the business of securing rights in "classic" jazz master recordings and manufacturing and distributing phono records derived from such master recordings.

Selected discography

Newman's collection 
Newman, while a student at Columbia in 1941, lugged his acetate disc recording machine — a portable Wilcox-Gay Recordio "disc cutter" — to jazz clubs in Harlem, including Minton's Playhouse on 118th Street and Clark Monroe’s Uptown House on 134th Street, both of which were incubators of jazz of the day.  Newman's collection became the backbone for Onyx Recording, Inc.

 Art Tatum at Minton's in 1941, issued by Onyx after being declined by Columbia, on the LP God Is In The House.  At the 16th Annual Grammy Awards held in March 1974, the album won two Grammys, one for Best Improvised Jazz Solo and one for Best Liner Notes, written by Morgenstern
 Newman's recordings have been issued as unauthorized records, variously over the years, but none were done so with the permission or participation of the artists or their estates.

Re-release of broadcast transcriptions of KFBI radio, Wichita 
The Jay McShann Band recorded two sessions – one on November 30, 1940, and one on December 2, 1940 — at the studio of KFBI radio, Wichita, for broadcast transcriptions.  The band members were:

 Charlie Parker (1920–1955) (alto sax),
 Buddy Anderson (1919–1997) (trumpet)
 Orville "Piggy" Minor (1917–1999) (trumpet)
 Bud Gould (né James Frederick Gould; 1917–2002) (trombone, violin)
 William James Scott ("Scotty", grew-up in Kansas City) (tenor sax) †
 Jay McShann (1916–2006) (piano)
 Gene Ramey (1913–1984) (bass)
 Gus Johnson (1913–2000) (drums)
 Onyx ORI 221

† Replaced for the second sessions by Bob Mabane (né Robert Lee Mcbane, Jr.; 1914–1991) (tenor sax)

Charlie Parker 
A compilation album, Charlie Parker – First Recordings! (ORI 221), which included the KFBI sessions of November 30, 1940, and December 2, 1940, plus an AFRS #582 broadcast from the Savoy Ballroom on February 12, 1945 – released in 1974 – won a Grammy Award for Best Performance by a Soloist in 1975. The 1945 session featured Cootie Williams and his Orchestra: 
 Cootie Williams, Harold "Money" Johnson, Ermit V. Perry, George Treadwell (trumpets); Ed Burke, Bob Horton (trombones); Charlie Parker, Frank Powell (alto saxes); Lee Pope, Sam "The Man" Taylor (tenor saxes); Eddie de Verteuil (bari sax); Arnold Jarvis (piano); Leroy Kirkland (guitar); Carl Pruitt (double bass); Sylvester "Vess" Payne (drum kit); Tony Warren (vocalist)

Onyx principals 
 Don Schlitten, president, was an RCA producer who, at the time, had been producing RCA Vintage Series
 Gentry McCreary, general manager
 Fields was also the sole shareholder of Blanchris, Inc., the parent company of Muse Records (co-founded by both Fields and Schlitten). Muse was primarily in the business of recording and distributing contemporary jazz records.

Selected artists 

 Louis Armstrong
 Dave Bailey
 Louis Bellson
 Sonny Berman
 Don Byas
 Sid Catlett
 Charlie Christian
 Kenny Clarke
 Buck Clayton
 Teddy Edwards
 Roy Eldridge
 Duke Ellington
 Tommy Flanagan
 Slim Gaillard
 Vivien Garry
 Dexter Gordon
 Wardell Gray
 Bobby Hackett
 Edmond Hall
 Clyde Hart
 Coleman Hawkins
 J.C. Heard
 Johnny Hodges
 Russell Jacquet
 Nat Jaffe
 Barney Kessel
 Dodo Marmarosa
 Jay McShann
 Mills Blue Rhythm Band
 Theloneous Monk
 Clark Monroe
 Hot Lips Page
 Charlie Parker
 Leo Parker
 Flip Phillips
 Art Pepper
 Don Redman
 Red Rodney
 Jimmy Rushing
 Tony Scott
 Charlie Shavers
 Slam Stewart
 Maxine Sullivan
 Art Tatum
 Joe Thomas
 Dave Tough
 Ben Webster
 Cootie Williams
 Mary Lou Williams
 Lester Young

See also 
 Muse Records had no label or business connection with Onyx, but, nonetheless, was co-founded by the same people.
 Xanadu Records was a label founded by Don Schlitten
 HighNote Records has re-issued some recordings from Onyx's catalog
 Legal case
 Onyx Club in dictionary
 "Ars Gratia Tatum: A Brief Biographical Sketch Of Art Tatum, The Greatest Pianist In Jazz," by Ron Davis, Toronto (1978; 2009)

Other labels with a similar name 
 Onyx Records, an American rockabilly label from the late 1950s, owned by Jerry Winston.  The label was known for having recorded The Velours.
 Onyx International Records, a gospel label

Notes and references

Notes

Discography references

Inline citations 

Record labels established in 1971
Jazz record labels
American record labels
New York (state) record labels
Record labels disestablished in 1978
Defunct record labels of the United States
Companies based in Manhattan
1971 establishments in New York City
1978 disestablishments in New York (state)
American companies established in 1971
American companies disestablished in 1978